Ronnie Båthman and Anders Järryd were the defending champions but did not compete that year.

Byron Black and Jonathan Stark won in the final 6–3, 7–6 against Mike Bauer and David Prinosil.

Seeds

  Byron Black /  Jonathan Stark (champions)
  Scott Davis /  Richey Reneberg (first round)
  Mike Bauer /  David Prinosil (final)
  Karel Nováček /  Jason Stoltenberg (first round)

Draw

External links
 1993 CA-TennisTrophy Doubles draw

Doubles